Elaphe quadrivirgata, commonly known as the Japanese four-lined ratsnake or the Japanese striped snake (Japanese: shimahebi = striped snake), is a species of non-venomous colubrid snake native to Japan.

Geographic range
It is found in all areas of Japan apart from the Ryukyu Islands.

Description
It typically grows to a length of 1-1.5 m (40–60 in). The snake has a yellow or light brown ground color, and gets its scientific and common names from the four black lengthwise stripes sported by most individuals of the species. All-black variants exist; these are known in Japan as karasu-hebi (crow snakes).

Juveniles are reddish, and instead of lengthwise stripes have crosswise stripes and a spotted pattern similar to some venomous snakes. 
photo
photo

The dorsal scales, which are weakly keeled in adults but may be smooth in juveniles, are arranged in 19 rows. The ventrals, which are angulate laterally, number 193–210. The anal scale is usually divided, and the subcaudals, which are also divided (paired), number 70–96.

Behavior
Elaphe quadrivirgata is an active, diurnal snake.

Diet
It feeds on a variety of prey items, including frogs, lizards, insects, rodents, as well as birds and their eggs.

References

External links
 (in Japanese)

Further reading

 Boie, H. 1826. Merkmale einiger japanischer Lurche. Isis von Oken 19: 203–216. (Coluber quadrivirgatus, pp. 209–210.)
 Jan, G., & F. Sordelli. 1867. Iconographie général des Ophidiens: Vingt-quatrième livraison. Ballière. Paris. Index + Plates I.- VI. (Elaphis quadrivirgatus, Plate I., Figures 1–3.)
 Stejneger, L. 1907. Herpetology of Japan and Adjacent Territory. United States National Museum Bulletin 58. Smithsonian Institution. Washington, District of Columbia. xx + 577 pp. (Elaphe quadrivirgata, pp. 327–333 + Plate XXI.)

Elaphe
Endemic reptiles of Japan
Reptiles described in 1826